Seymour Boyers (October 9, 1926 – January 7, 2019) was an American politician who served in the New York City Council from 1962 to 1965 and in the New York State Assembly from the 24th district from 1967 to 1968.

He died on January 7, 2019, in Queens, New York City, New York at 92.

References

1926 births
2019 deaths
New York City Council members
Democratic Party members of the New York State Assembly